Zabrus spectabilis is a species of greenish-black coloured ground beetle in the Pelor subgenus that can be found in Armenia, Iran, and Turkey.

References

Beetles described in 1852
Beetles of Asia
Zabrus